Nishioka (written:  lit. "west hill") is a Japanese surname. Notable people with the surname include:

, Japanese footballer
, Japanese businessman and politician
Hayward Nishioka (born 1942), American judoka
, Japanese footballer
, Japanese women's basketball player
Rodger Nishioka, American educator
, Japanese fencer
, Japanese politician
, Japanese boxer
, Japanese carpenter
, Japanese martial artist
, Japanese academic
, Japanese baseball player
, Japanese swimmer
, Japanese tennis player

Japanese-language surnames